Nkandu Phoebe Luo (born 21 December 1951) is a Zambian microbiologist and politician who was a vice presidential candidate for the Patriotic Front in the August 2021 election. She is a microbiologist who previously served as Head of Pathology and Microbiology at the University Teaching Hospital in Lusaka and has carried out extensive research into HIV/AIDS.

Early life and education
Luo was born at Lubwa Mission Hospital in Chinsali on 21 December 1951. Her parents were both teachers and Luo was one of the eight surviving children. She attended Roma Girls Secondary School and Dominican Convent. She has a MSc in microbiology from Moscow State University and a MSc and PhD in immunology from the University of Brunei Darussalam.

Career
Luo worked at Saint Mary's Hospital in London. She became a professor in microbiology and immunology at the University of Zambia in 1993 and worked as Head of Pathology and Microbiology at the University Teaching Hospital, Lusaka, Zambia. She has published numerous journal articles on HIV/AIDS.

Luo was elected to parliament representing the Movement for Multi-Party Democracy in the Mandevu constituency in 1996. She served as Deputy Minister of Health from 1997 to 1999 and Health Minister in 1999, however she clashed with both donors and health workers and was moved from the post in November 1999 and replaced by David Mpamba. She was Minister of Transport and Communications from 1999 to 2001 before losing her seat in the 2001 election.

Luo created a network of thirty national AIDS advocacy groups and founded non-profit organisation Tasintha, which seeks to free Zambia from commercial sex-work and HIV/AIDS. She established the National AIDS Control program, the National Blood Transfusion Service and the Prevention of Mother to Child transmission of HIV/AIDS program.

Luo was elected as the Patriotic Front representative for Munali constituency in 2011. She was appointed as Minister of Local Government and Housing by Michael Sata, serving from 2011 to 2014, and then became Minister of Chiefs and Traditional Affairs from 2014 to 2015. Luo was sworn in as Minister of Gender by Edgar Lungu in February 2015. In March 2016, Luo was adopted as President of the Women Parliamentary caucus at the 134th Inter Parliamentary Union conference in Lusaka. In September 2016, she became Zambia's Higher Education Minister. Luo was appointed as the minister of fisheries and livestock in 2019. On October 20, 2019, she threatened to cancel the memorandum of understanding with the Zambia Cooperative Federation (ZCF) for the construction of an agricultural industrial park in Chipata worth 1billion.

Luo was the running mate for President Lungu in the August 2021 election after Vice President Inonge Wina announced her decision to retire.

Selected publications

Personal life
Luo is a mother of two and grandmother of 4. She spends her free time with her close family and also dapples in delivering lectures to students on various platforms on various subjects.

References

External links
 National Assembly of Zambia profile
 Ministry of Gender profile

Living people
1951 births
Women microbiologists
Zambian infectious disease physicians
HIV/AIDS researchers
Movement for Multi-Party Democracy politicians
Patriotic Front (Zambia) politicians
Women government ministers of Zambia
20th-century Zambian women politicians
20th-century Zambian politicians
21st-century Zambian women politicians
21st-century Zambian politicians
Members of the National Assembly of Zambia
Transport ministers of Zambia
Gender ministers of Zambia
Local government ministers of Zambia
Health ministers of Zambia
Higher Education ministers of Zambia
People from Chinsali District
Academic staff of the University of Zambia
Moscow State University alumni